In mathematics, especially order theory,
the interval order for a collection of intervals on the real line
is the partial order corresponding to their left-to-right precedence relation—one interval, I1, being considered less than another, I2, if I1 is completely to the left of I2.
More formally, a countable poset  is an interval order if and only if
so ,
such that for any  we have
 in  exactly when .
Such posets may be equivalently
characterized as those with no induced subposet isomorphic to the
pair of two-element chains, in other words as the -free posets
.

The subclass of interval orders obtained by restricting the intervals to those of unit length, so they all have the form , is precisely the semiorders.

The complement of the comparability graph of an interval order (≤)
is the interval graph .

Interval orders should not be confused with the interval-containment orders, which are the inclusion orders on intervals on the real line (equivalently, the orders of dimension ≤ 2).

Interval orders and dimension 

For interval orders, dimension can be arbitrarily large. And while the problem of determining the dimension of general partial orders is known to be NP-hard, determining the dimension of an interval order remains a problem of unknown computational complexity.

A related parameter is interval dimension, which is defined analogously, but in terms of interval orders instead of linear orders.
The interval dimension of an order is never greater than its order dimension.

Combinatorics 

In addition to being isomorphic to -free posets,
with a subset of fixed-point-free involutions 
on ordered sets with cardinality 
.  These are the
involutions with no so-called left- or right-neighbor nestings where, for any involution
an  such that  and a right nesting is an  such that
.

Such involutions, according to semi-length, have ordinary generating function

 

The sequence of these numbers  begins

1, 2, 5, 15, 53, 217, 1014, 5335, 31240, 201608, 1422074, 10886503, 89903100, 796713190, 7541889195, 75955177642, …

Notes

References
.
.
.
.
.

Further reading

Order theory
Combinatorics